Adam Nikolayevich Vishnyakov (born 24 February 1991) is a former Russian professional football player.

Club career
He made his Russian Football National League debut for FC Shinnik Yaroslavl on 21 April 2010 in a game against FC Nizhny Novgorod.

External links
 
 
  Career profile at sportbox.ru

1993 births
People from Vologda
Living people
Russian footballers
Association football forwards
FC Shinnik Yaroslavl players
Footballers from Vologda